The English Magpie is a breed of fancy pigeon developed over many years of selective breeding. They can also be very easily spotted in England and in most parts of America. Magpies, along with other varieties of domesticated pigeons, are all descendants from the rock pigeon (Columba livia). The original Magpie was one of the old tumbler varieties, coming via Germany from Denmark about 1900.

See also 
List of pigeon breeds

References

Pigeon breeds

External Links
English Magpie Pigeon: Breed Guide Pigeonpedia